Populus × canescens, the grey poplar, is a hybrid between Populus alba (white poplar) and P. tremula (common aspen). It is intermediate between its parents, with a thin grey downy coating on the leaves, which are much less deeply lobed than the leaves of P. alba. Most trees in cultivation are male, but female trees occur naturally and some of these are also propagated.

Taxonomy
In 1789 William Aiton described the grey poplar as a variety of Populus alba, P. alba var. canescens. In 1804, James Edward Smith raised it to a full species, P. canescens. He described differences between the leaves of the two taxa: P. alba has lobed leaves with snow-white ("niveus") undersides, whereas P. canescens has wavy-edged leaves with hoary ("incanus") undersides. Later authors sometimes noted the possibility that the grey poplar was a hybrid. It is now considered to be a hybrid between P. alba and P. tremula, so the scientific name is written with the hybrid symbol.

References

canescens
Plant nothospecies